Benedict Onamkulam (1929–2001) was an Indian priest who was convicted of the murder, rape and impregnation of a woman in 1960 and sentenced to death. He was acquitted in 1967 due to a lack of evidence. He was later on found to be innocent of all the crimes 34 years later.

See also
 Madatharuvi case

References

1929 births
Indian Roman Catholic priests
2001 deaths